Paulding County is a county located in the U.S. state of Ohio. As of the 2020 census, the population was about 18,806. Its county seat is Paulding. The county was created in 1820 and later organized in 1839. It is named for John Paulding, one of the captors of Major John André in the American Revolutionary War.

History

The Ottawa tribe of Native Americans were the prevalent occupants of the region before Europeans arrived in North America following the 1492 expedition of Christopher Columbus. By 1750, however, there were Miamis, Prankaahaws, Delawares, Shawnee, Kickapoos, Muscounteres, Huron, Weas, Wyandotts and Mohawks.

Under the Northwest Ordinance of 1787, the Continental Congress opened what is now Ohio, Indiana, Illinois, Michigan, and Wisconsin to settlement. However, the Treaty of Paris that ended the American Revolution in 1783 allowed the British to remain in the Northwest Territory until matters were resolved with the Indians. General Washington sent General "Mad" Anthony Wayne to subdue the native population. He built a series of forts, including Fort Brown, located between Charloe and Melrose. In order to defend against Indian ambush, he cut a swath of woods a mile wide, known as the Wayne Trace. His campaign culminated in a decisive 1794 victory by the Legion of the United States against Indians led by Chief Little Turtle of the nearby Maumee, Ohio in the Battle of Fallen Timbers, and signing of the Treaty of Greenville in 1795.

Paulding County was originally part of territory set aside for Ohio's Indian people by the Treaty of Greenville, though that did not last long. Paulding County was organized by the legislature on April 1, 1820 from lands that were formerly part of Williams County. At that point, it consisted of 12 perfectly square townships. In 1845, Defiance County was formed from lands that were part of Williams County, plus the northern half of Auglaize Township. It was at this time that four sections of Emerald Township were transferred to Auglaize Township.

Settlement of Paulding County was slow, due to the difficult living conditions. Farmers complained that they grew two crops a year - frogs and ice. Many residents suffered from the ague, a disease later determined to be malaria. The primary industries were based on the thick forests. Many timbers were floated up the Maumee River to be used as ship's masts. The trees were so large that one man lived in a hollow tree. There were also many who earned money through the winter by crafting barrel staves with an adze.

George Washington had promoted the construction of canals to provide interior transportation for the fledgling nation. Once the Erie Canal was opened in 1825, entrepreneurs promoted other canals, including the Miami and Erie Canal and the Wabash and Erie Canal. The Miami and Erie ran from Lake Erie to the Little Miami River near Cincinnati, through Paulding County, and the Wabash and Erie Canal went west into Indiana, meeting the Miami and Erie in Junction, a community in Auglaize township. The canal excitement was so great that people were leaving Fort Wayne, Indiana for Junction, feeling that it had a much brighter future. Canal workers choosing Paulding County as their tax home built the county's population to 25,000 people in 1835, a number it has never approached since.

The combined canal system was the largest canal system in the world, but was profitable for only a short period. The canal was useless in winter, and the banks were constantly caving in, requiring constant dredging to remain passable. To protect the banks, canal boats had to operate at extremely slow speed.  The canal system started being abandoned even before it was completely built. The coming of the railroad quickly supplanted the canals as the primary means of long-haul travel.

A relic of this era is the Furnace Farm near Cecil. Ore was brought in by canal, where it was turned into iron using the ample local fuel. One furnace remains, where it was allowed to cool without being emptied, there being no point in pouring iron that could not be shipped economically to market.

Built in the 1910s, the Paulding County Carnegie Library was the first Carnegie library to serve an entire county instead of a single city.  In addition to the library, Andrew  Carnegie matched local funds to install a pipe organ in what is now known as Paulding United Methodist Church.

In the early 20th century, Paulding had the highest unsolved murder rate of any county in the USA. The Purple Gang was thought to be exporting the corpses of their victims to the rural countryside, where they could be dumped without being seen. The sheriff argued that they were not local people, not murdered locally, and it was not worth spending large sums of tax dollars on what was essentially a littering problem.

Geography

The center of the county is 723 feet above sea level, and the rest of the county does not vary much from that. The land is the most level of any county in the state, and plats look like a checkerboard, with roads every mile. This level terrain resulted in Paulding County being entirely within the Great Black Swamp, unlike any other.

The county contains U.S. Routes 127, 24, and 30 (the Lincoln Highway). There are two major rivers, the Auglaize and the Maumee, as well as numerous small creeks. The largest bodies of water are manmade ponds.

Adjacent counties
 Defiance County (north)
 Putnam County (east)
 Van Wert County (south)
 Allen County, Indiana (west)

Demographics

2000 census
As of the census of 2000, there were 20,293 people, 7,773 households, and 5,689 families living in the county. The population density was 49 people per square mile (19/km2). There were 8,478 housing units at an average density of 20 per square mile (8/km2). The racial makeup of the county was 95.85% White, 0.96% Black or African American, 0.29% Native American, 0.15% Asian, 0.01% Pacific Islander, 1.41% from other races, and 1.33% from two or more races. 3.02% of the population were Hispanic or Latino.

There were 7,773 households, out of which 34.10% had children under the age of 18 living with them, 60.90% were married couples living together, 8.10% had a female householder with no husband present, and 26.80% were non-families. 23.00% of all households were made up of individuals, and 10.30% had someone living alone who was 65 years of age or older. The average household size was 2.59 and the average family size was 3.06.

In the county, the population was spread out, with 26.80% under the age of 18, 8.60% from 18 to 24, 28.00% from 25 to 44, 24.00% from 45 to 64, and 12.60% who were 65 years of age or older. The median age was 36 years. For every 100 females there were 96.70 males. For every 100 females age 18 and over, there were 95.40 males.

The median income for a household in the county was $40,327, and the median income for a family was $45,481. Males had a median income of $35,809 versus $21,965 for females. The per capita income for the county was $18,062. About 4.90% of families and 7.70% of the population were below the poverty line, including 9.50% of those under age 18 and 7.10% of those age 65 or over.

2010 census
As of the 2010 United States Census, there were 19,614 people, 7,769 households, and 5,467 families living in the county. The racial makeup of the county was 95.7% white, 0.9% black or African American, 0.3% American Indian, 0.2% Asian, 1.3% from other races, and 1.6% from two or more races. Those of Hispanic or Latino origin made up 4.3% of the population. In terms of ancestry, 40.1% were German, 10.5% were Irish, 10.4% were English, and 10.4% were American.

Of the 7,769 households, 32.5% had children under the age of 18 living with them, 56.1% were married couples living together, 9.2% had a female householder with no husband present, 29.6% were non-families, and 25.0% of all households were made up of individuals. The average household size was 2.51 and the average family size was 2.99. The median age was 40.0 years.

The median income for a household in the county was $46,459 and the median income for a family was $56,170. Males had a median income of $38,656 versus $27,182 for females. The per capita income for the county was $20,919. About 8.6% of families and 11.0% of the population were below the poverty line, including 17.6% of those under age 18 and 8.9% of those age 65 or over.

Politics
Paulding County is a Republican stronghold county in presidential elections. Lyndon B. Johnson in 1964 was the last Democratic candidate to win the county. In the 1980 Senate election, while Democrat John Glenn won the state by 40 points, Paulding County was the only county he lost, by 5.5 points, after winning it by 24 points in his previous election where he carried all counties. However, the county would back Glenn again in his last two elections in 1986 and 1992.

|}

Education
In 1971, the Ohio Board of Education revoked the charters of Payne, Blue Creek, Grover Hill and Auglaize-Brown school districts. Blue Creek was itself the merger of Latty and Haviland schools only a few years prior. Payne, Blue Creek, and Grover Hill merged to form the Wayne Trace school district, and Auglaize-Brown joined Paulding Exempted Village Schools.
 Antwerp Local School District 
 Paulding Exempted Village School District 
 Wayne Trace Local School District 
 Vantage Career Center 

In the late 1950s, Paulding Exempted Village Schools enacted a pay-as-you-go tax for school construction, designed to reduce overall taxes by paying cash for school construction rather than paying high interest rates on bonds. The pay-as-you-go concept has been adopted in a number of local government units in Ohio.

With students from kindergarten to high school at one location, the Paulding campus of PEVS is one of the largest schools in the state.

Communities

Villages

 Antwerp
 Broughton
 Cecil
 Grover Hill
 Haviland
 Latty
 Melrose
 Oakwood
 Paulding (county seat)
 Payne
 Scott

Townships

 Auglaize
 Benton
 Blue Creek
 Brown
 Carryall
 Crane
 Emerald
 Harrison
 Jackson
 Latty
 Paulding
 Washington

Unincorporated communities
 Junction
 Mandale
 Roselms

Interesting facts
The Paulding County motto of "No Compromise" came from a banner carried by participants in the Reservoir War.

Paulding County was the first county in the US to receive funding from steel magnate Andrew Carnegie to build a library. Carnegie also matched funds to purchase the pipe organ in the Paulding Methodist Church.

Judge Calvin L. Noble of Paulding County spent the better part of his life as a Paulding County resident. His claim to fame is that he changed the name of the city of Cleaveland, Ohio to Cleveland. Earlier in life, as a printer, he founded the Cleaveland Advertiser. As the name was slightly too long to fit atop the page, he omitted the one letter.

Paulding County was the last county in the United States with no providers offering coverage through the Patient Protection and Affordable Care Act policies on the government's health insurance exchange. In August 2017, CareSources announced plans to sell healthcare through the exchange.

See also
 National Register of Historic Places listings in Paulding County, Ohio

References

Further reading

External links
 Paulding County Library
 Extension Office
 Paulding Progress newspaper
 County Engineer's office (official maps of the county)
 West Bend News newspaper

 
1839 establishments in Ohio
Populated places established in 1839